Andreas Fragkou (born 19 January 1997) is a Cypriot footballer who plays as a midfielder for Nea Salamina.

References

External links

1997 births
Living people
Cypriot footballers
Cyprus youth international footballers
Cypriot First Division players
AEL Limassol players
Apollon Limassol FC players
Aris Limassol FC players
Enosis Neon Paralimni FC players
Karmiotissa FC players
Nea Salamis Famagusta FC players
Association football midfielders
Sportspeople from Limassol